Saudi Ports Authority is a government agency that supervises the ports of Saudi Arabia.  It was founded in 1976 as an independent agency of the Prime Minister's office, to bring together the governance and operations of the multiple ports of the country to one office. Over time the actual operation of the ports was devolved by government contract to independent port operating companies.

Ports
Saudi Ports Authority supervises the following major Saudi ports:

 Jeddah Islamic Port
 King Abdulaziz Port Dammam
King Fahad Industrial Port Yanbu
King Fahad Industrial Port Jubail
 Jubail Commercial Port
Yanbu Commercial Port
 Jizan Port
 Dhiba Port
 Ras Al-khair Port

See also

Transport in Saudi Arabia
Port authority
Port operator
Oil tanker

References

External links
Saudi Ports Authority official site

Port authorities
Government of Saudi Arabia
1976 establishments in Saudi Arabia
Government agencies established in 1976
Water transport in Saudi Arabia
Persian Gulf
Red Sea